The girls' 4 × 100 metre freestyle relay event at the 2018 Summer Youth Olympics took place on 11 October at the Natatorium in Buenos Aires, Argentina.

Results

Final
The final was held at 19:14.

References

Swimming at the 2018 Summer Youth Olympics